Highland Superstores was an American consumer electronics and home appliance chain. It was founded in 1933 as Highland Appliance by Harry Mondry in Highland Park, Michigan. By the end of the 1970s, the chain had 18 stores throughout the midwest with headquarters in Plymouth, Michigan. 

The chain went public in 1985, at which point it was the second-largest American electronics retailer behind Circuit City. Despite its number of locations, the chain began to experience financial troubles in the late 1980s and early 1990s.  In 1990, Highland hired an investment firm to decide the chain's future. At this point, it had also expanded into New York and Texas. Upon fierce competition in Texas, they left the area in 1991 and announced they would concentrate on keeping their remaining 50 stores in the Midwest.

Highland filed for Chapter 11 bankruptcy in August 1992, and liquidated its last 30 stores in 1993.

References

Consumer electronics retailers in the United States
Defunct companies based in Michigan
Defunct retail companies of the United States
Defunct consumer electronics retailers in the United States
Companies based in Wayne County, Michigan
Highland Park, Michigan
1933 establishments in Michigan
1993 disestablishments in Michigan
Retail companies established in 1933
Retail companies disestablished in 1993
Companies that filed for Chapter 11 bankruptcy in 1992